Yaracuy may refer to:

Places
Venezuela
 Yaracuy, one of the 23 states which make up the country
 Yaracuy River

Other uses
 Yaracuyanos FC, a Venezuelan football club